Semi-proportional representation characterizes multi-winner electoral systems which allow representation of minorities, but are not intended to reflect the strength of the competing political forces in close proportion to the votes they receive. Semi-proportional voting systems can be regarded as compromises between forms of proportional representation such as party-list PR, and plurality/majoritarian systems such as first-past-the-post voting. Examples of semi-proportional systems include the single non-transferable vote, limited voting, and parallel voting.

Semi-proportional systems
Most proportional representation systems do not yield precisely proportional outcomes due to the use of election thresholds, small electoral regions, or other implementation details that vary from one elected body to another. This article deals primarily with systems inherently designed to produce moderately proportional election results.

The choice to use a semi-proportional electoral system may be a deliberate attempt to find a balance between single-party rule and proportional representation. Semi-proportional systems can allow for fairer representation of those parties that have difficulty gaining individual seats while retaining the possibility of one party gaining an overall majority when there is a landslide victory.

Because there are many measures of proportionality, and because there is no objective threshold, opinions may differ on what constitutes a semi-proportional system as opposed to a majoritarian or a fully proportional system.

Non-partisan systems
Election systems in which parties can only achieve proportionality by coordinating their voters are usually considered to be semi-proportional. They are not majoritarian, since in the perfect case the outcome will be proportional, but they are not proportional either, since such a perfect case requires a very high degree of coordination. Such systems include the single non-transferable vote and limited voting, the latter of which becomes less proportional the more votes each voter has. The cumulative voting also allows minority representation, concentrating votes over the number of candidates that every minor party thinks it can support.

This group of non-partisan systems is, at least technically, non-partisan. Certainly, a group of candidates can coordinate their campaigns, and politically present themselves as party members, but there is no obligation for electors to respect those party links, and forms of panachage are usually possible.

Single transferable vote
Some consider STV to be a semi-proportional system. The degree of proportionality across the country depends on the average size of constituencies. In the 2011 Irish general election, Fine Gael came nine seats (4.8%) short of an overall majority with just 36.1% of the first preference votes. However the result of the election was exceptional, and Fine Gael benefited from a high level of transfers from those who did not rank them first. Under STV a party can win an overall majority with significantly fewer than 50% of the votes, but only if the party also gains a high level of transfers from those who do not rank them first. As it lacks any arbitrary nationwide election threshold, even with the Irish 3 to 5 seat system the level of proportionality does not veer too far from countries with such thresholds.

Partisan systems
 
Other forms of semi-proportional representation are based on, or at least use, party lists to work. Looking to the electoral systems effectively in use around the world, there are three general methods to reinforce the majoritarian principle of representation (but not necessarily majoritarianism or majority rule, see electoral inversion and plurality) starting from basic PR mechanisms: parallel voting, the majority bonus system (MBS), and extremely reduced constituency magnitude.

In additional member systems (AMS) where the additional members are not sufficient to balance the disproportionality of the original system can produce less than proportional results, especially in the National Assembly for Wales where only 33.3% of members are compensatory. The electoral system commonly referred to in Britain as the "additional member system" is also used for the Scottish Parliament, and the London Assembly, with generally proportional results. Similarly, in vote transfer based mixed single vote systems the number of compensatory seats may be too low (or too high) to achieve proportionality, such a system is used in Hungary in local elections The "scorporo" system used for the Parliament of Italy from 1993 to 2005 and the electoral system for the National Assembly of Hungary since 1990 are also special cases, based on parallel voting, but also including compensatory mechanisms – which however are insufficient for providing proportional results.

A majority bonus system takes an otherwise proportional system based on multi-member constituencies, and introduces disproportionality by granting additional seats to the first party or alliance. Majority bonuses help produce landslide victories similar to those which occur in elections under plurality systems. The majority bonus system was first introduced by Benito Mussolini to win the election of 1924, then it was later used in Italy again, with additional democratic limits, and then again expanded in some neighboring countries like San Marino, Greece and France.

The simplest mechanism to reinforce major parties in PR system is a severely reduced constituency magnitude, so to reduce the possibility for minor national parties to gain seats. If the Spanish electoral system is still considered a form of proportional representation, the binomial voting system used in Chile effectively establishes by law a two-party rule over the country.

The last main group usually considered semi-proportional consists of parallel voting models. The system used for the Chamber of Deputies of Mexico since 1996 is considered a parallel voting system, modified by a list-seat ceiling (8%) for over-representation of parties.

Usage

References 

Electoral systems